Carmen Dolores Martín Berenguer (born 29 May 1988) is a Spanish handballer who plays as a right wing for IK Sävehof and the Spanish national team.

Martín has three All-European Championship first team selections, one All-World Championship first team selection and also one All-EHF Champions League first team selection. In 2016, she won the Champions League with CSM București.

In 2016, she was made 'honorary citizen' of Bucharest.

Achievements 
Spanish Championship:
Winner: 2011, 2012
Spanish Queen's Cup:
Winner: 2011, 2012
Spanish Supercup:
Winner: 2011, 2012
Slovenian Championship:
Winner: 2013
Slovenian Cup:
Winner: 2013
Romanian Championship:
Winner: 2015, 2016, 2017
Romanian Cup:
Winner: 2016
Swedish Cup:
Winner: 2023
Olympic Games:
Bronze Medalist: 2012
World Championship:
Bronze Medalist: 2011
European Championship:
Silver Medalist: 2008, 2014
EHF Champions League:
Winner: 2016
Silver Medalist: 2011
Bronze Medalist: 2017

Awards and recognition
All-Star Right Wing of the World Championship: 2011
All-Star Right Wing of the European Championship: 2014, 2016, 2018
 Handball-Planet.com Best Right Wing: 2016
 All-Star Right Wing of the EHF Champions League: 2017
 Prosport All-Star Right Wing of the Romanian Liga Națională: 2017
All-Star Right Wing of the Romanian League: 2021

References

External links

1988 births
Living people
Sportspeople from Almería
Spanish female handball players
Olympic medalists in handball
Olympic handball players of Spain
Handball players at the 2012 Summer Olympics
Handball players at the 2016 Summer Olympics
Olympic bronze medalists for Spain
Medalists at the 2012 Summer Olympics
Expatriate handball players
Spanish expatriate sportspeople in Slovenia
Spanish expatriate sportspeople in Romania
Spanish expatriate sportspeople in France
Spanish expatriate sportspeople in Sweden
Mediterranean Games medalists in handball
Mediterranean Games gold medalists for Spain
Competitors at the 2005 Mediterranean Games
Competitors at the 2009 Mediterranean Games
Handball players at the 2020 Summer Olympics
21st-century Spanish women